The Ailanthus class were a group of 35 wooden-hulled net laying ships of the United States Navy built during World War II as part of the huge building programs of late 1941 and early 1942 for small patrol and mine warfare vessels.  Five of the class were transferred to the British Royal Navy under Lend-Lease, and another five were converted while at their shipyards into Auxiliary Fleet Tugs, the ATA-214-class.

Armament
In the original design, in addition to the 3-inch gun mounted forward of the bridge, there were two single 20 mm guns mounted on top of the bridge. In September 1944, as a trial, a third 20 mm gun was installed on a small elevated platform mounted on a pedestal between the bridge and the smokestack on Terebinth (AN-59), but it was found that the arc of fire was restricted, that the platform was too hot to permit the storage of ready ammunition, and that the gun crew became ill from engine fumes. Instead, two additional single 20 mm guns were installed at the after end of the deckhouse on AN 39-63 and 66-69. In April 1945 the four single mounts were ordered to be replaced with four twin mounts, but this change does not seem to have been made.

Losses
Two ships of the class were lost during the war;
 USS Ailanthus (AN-38), was wrecked barely a month after commissioning, running aground in the Aleutians on 26 February 1944, and was declared a total loss on 14 March 1944.
 USS Snowbell (AN-52), was driven hard aground when Typhoon Louise hit Buckner Bay, Okinawa, on 9 October 1945 and was declared beyond repair. The wreck was blown up in January 1946.

Disposal
In early 1946 six of the ships, Cliffrose (AN-42), Cinnamon (AN-50), Silverbell (AN-51), Torchwood (AN-55), Catclaw (AN-60), and Shellbark (AN-67), were transferred to the Republic of China's Maritime Customs Service at Shanghai, while the remainder were disposed of in 1947 in a Maritime Commission sales program for small vessels.

Ships

References

External links

 Net Laying Ship Index at NavSource Naval History

 

 
Auxiliary gateship classes
Auxiliary ship classes of the United States Navy